Minahasan cuisine or Manado cuisine is the cooking tradition of the Minahasan people of North Sulawesi, Indonesia. It is popularly known as "Manadonese cuisine" after Manado, the capital of the  province, although other cities in Northern Sulawesi, such as Bitung, Tomohon and Tondano, are also known as Minahasan culinary hotspots. Manadonese cuisine is known for its rich variations in seafood, generous amount of spices, extra-hot condiments, exotic meats, and European-influenced cakes and pastries.
Popular Manadonese dishes include tinutuan (Manado-style vegetable and rice congee), cakalang fufu (smoked skipjack tuna), cakalang noodle, paniki (spiced fruit bat), chicken or various fish and seafood spiced in rica-rica or woku spices, chicken tuturuga, and brenebon.

Although not as popular and as widely distributed as Padang food and Sundanese cuisine, there is increasing awareness of Manadonese cuisine in the Indonesian cuisine scene. Numbers of Manadonese restaurants are growing in Indonesian cities such as Jakarta, Bandung, Medan, Surabaya and Makassar.

Traditions and influences
Manadonese cuisine is marked by a mixture of native and foreign influences. Native Minahasan cooking tradition relies heavily on seafood as well as exotic bushmeats, and its heavy use of freshly chopped hot spices. It also demonstrates Chinese and Western influences (especially Portuguese and Dutch), most prominent in soups, cakes, and pastries.

Chicken and beef are commonly consumed. A significant number of Minahasans are Christians; the halal dietary law has thus not played an important role in the cuisine's development as it has for the Minahasans' Muslim neighbors on the Sulawesi island (the Gorontalos and Northern Maluku people). Pork, wild boar, and even dog meat and bat are hence more ubiquitous in Manadonese cuisine compared to other culinary traditions in the Indonesian archipelago.

Spices

Manadonese cuisine is well known for its generous use of spices, sometimes making up more than half of the whole dish's ingredients. It has given the cuisine the reputation of being hot and spicy, often from the freshly chopped chili peppers added in. Common spices used in Manadonese cuisine include lemongrass, kaffir lime leaves, lime juice, chili peppers, spring onions, shallots, garlic, cloves and candlenut. Seafood, pork and chicken are often cooked in Manadonese signature bumbu (spice blends), such as rica-rica and woku. Spicy condiments are also served as dipping sauce for seafood, such as dabu-dabu and sambal roa.

Cakes and pastries

Among Indonesian ethnicities, Minahasans are well known for their affinities with European culture. A number of European-influenced cakes and pastries made their way into the Minahasan kitchen. The most notable probably is klappertaart (from Dutch language, lit. coconut tart). Another example is panada, a Portuguese-influenced panada similar to empanadas and filled with spiced ground skipjack tuna.

Seafood

The Minahassa Peninsula – the northern arm of Sulawesi, a narrow peninsula that formed the North Sulawesi and Gorontalo provinces – is surrounded by seas on almost all sides. The Sulawesi Sea, Maluku Sea, and Gulf of Tomini have been fished by the Minahasan people for generations, and seafood has thus become a staple diet in Manado. The harbor cities of Manado and Bitung are the center of the fishing industry in the area. 

Various seafood such as cakalang (skipjack tuna), tude (mackerel), oci (larger mackerel), tuna, albacore, bobara (trevally), kakap (red snapper), kerapu (garoupa), tenggiri (wahoo), bawal (pomfret), shrimp, mussels and crabs are available in the marketplace, often being grilled on charcoal, and served in dabu-dabu, cooked in woku, in rica-rica, or in kuah asam soup.

Exotic meats

Minahasan people are also known for their bushmeats tradition. Before converting to Christianity in early 16th to 17th century, Minahasans were animists, and their practice on consuming almost every kind of animal still continued until this days. Rintek wuuk or RW (lit. Minahasan: "fine hair") is euphemism of dog meat. In Minahasan culture it is considered prestigious to consume rare and unusual meats. The marketplaces of the mountainous town of Tomohon and Tondano are notorious for selling various kinds of exotic bushmeats; from wild boar, field rats, patola snake (python), frog legs, paniki or fruit bats, and dog meat. Sometimes protected endangered animals such as yaki (Sulawesi black macaque), kuse (slow loris), tapir and anoa are illegally sold in marketplace as food.

List of dishes

Dishes

Vegetables & Soup

Snacks

Gallery

See also

Indonesian cuisine
Indo cuisine
Batak cuisine
Minahasa people

References

External links